Class 20 may refer to:

British Rail Class 20
GER Class D81, later LNER Class J20
NER Class R, later LNER Class D20
New South Wales Z20 class locomotive
SNCB Class 20
South African Class 20 2-10-2
South African Class 20E
U-20-class submarine